Eastwâld is a hamlet in the municipality of Dantumadiel in the province of Friesland, the Netherlands.

It is located to the east of Driezum with habitation on both sides of the Strobosser Trekfeart. On the east side, it passes into the hamlet of Keatlingwier. On the west side lies the Rinsma State. This was an important stately house and was also the town hall of Dantumadiel from 1971 until 1999. The Driezumer Bos is a wood that is situated around the state and on the southern grounds of the hamlet lies the recreation and nature area Rinsma pôlle. This was the former Petsleat / Swemmer dredging depot, used between 1972 and 1985.

History
The place was first mentioned in 1543 as Oestwoldt. In 1580 it was listed as Oestwoud.

It probably developed into its own place after the fist excavation part of the Strobosser Trekfeart in the 16th century. This boat / barge-canal was paid for by the inhabitants of the region themselves. In 1654-1656 the city Dokkum paid for the second part of the canal. But the costs were to high, so the canal came into the hands of creditors. To get money out of it, four toll houses were built along the canal. Two of them were placed at Eastwâld. In 1780 major maintenance was required on the canal, but the owners decided to sell the canal to the province of Friesland instead of deepening it themselves. In 1876 the Dutch government became the owner of the canal and the path, the Trekwei next to it.

In the 18th and 19th centuries the hamlet was called Oostwoude, this name also sometimes pops up in the 20th and 21st century alongside Oostwoud in Dutch. In West Frisian the place is called Eastwâld. In 2008 the municipality Dantumadiel decided that it was going the replace all the official Dutch names within the municipality with the West Frisian names, meaning that Eastwâld was from 2009 the official name for the hamlet.

References

Populated places in Friesland
Dantumadiel